This article shows the rosters of all participating teams at the men's handball tournament at the 2020 Summer Olympics in Tokyo.

Each roster consists of 15 players, where 14 can be chosen for each match. The players can be changed without restrictions.

Age, clubs, caps and goals as of the start of the tournament, 24 July 2021.

Group A

Argentina
The squad was announced on 2 July 2021. On 31 July, Federico Pizarro was replaced by Santiago Baronetto.

Head coach:  Manolo Cadenas

Brazil
The squad was announced on 12 July 2021. On 28 July, José Toledo was replaced by Henrique Teixeira.

Head coach: Marcus Oliveira

France
The squad was announced on 5 July 2021. On 2 August, Timothey N'Guessan was replaced by Romain Lagarde.

Head coach: Guillaume Gille

Germany
The squad was announced on 30 June 2021.

Head coach:  Alfreð Gíslason

Norway
The squad was announced on 3 July 2021. On 21 July, three days before the tournament started, it was announced that Gøran Johannessen had to leave because of an injury, and he was replaced by Simen Holand Pettersen.

Head coach: Christian Berge

Spain
The squad was announced on 14 July 2021. On 29 July, Viran Morros was replaced by Miguel Sánchez-Migallón.

Head coach: Jordi Ribera

Group B

Bahrain
The squad was announced on 11 July 2021. On 27 July, Komail Mahfoodh was replaced by Bilal Basham Askani.

Head coach:   Aron Kristjánsson

Denmark
The squad was announced on 1 July 2021.

Head coach: Nikolaj Jacobsen

Egypt
The squad was announced on 12 July 2021.

Head coach:  Roberto García Parrondo

Japan
The squad was announced on 8 July 2021.

Head coach:  Dagur Sigurðsson

Portugal
The squad was announced on 13 July 2021.

Head coach: Paulo Pereira

Sweden
The squad was announced on 18 June 2021. Anton Lindskog was added after the squad limit was increased from 14 to 15 players.

Head coach:  Glenn Solberg

See also
Handball at the 2020 Summer Olympics – Women's team rosters

References

Men's team rosters
2020
Handball Men's